This article describes the qualifying for the 2013–14 EHF Champions League.

Format
A total of 14 teams will take part in the qualification tournaments. The clubs will be drawn into three groups of four and play a semifinal and the final. The winner of the qualification groups advance to the group stage, while the eliminated clubs will go to the EHF Cup. Matches will be played at 31 August–1 September 2013. The draw took place on 27 June, at 14:00 local time at Vienna, Austria.

Seedings
Two remaining teams played a knock-out match, the winner went into the group stage.

Qualification tournament 1
HT Tatran Prešov organized the tournament.

Semifinals

Third place game

Final

Qualification tournament 2
RK Vojvodina organized the tournament.

Semifinals

Third place game

Final

Qualification tournament 3
F.C. Porto organized the tournament.

Semifinals

Third place game

Final

Playoff
The winner advanced to the group stage.

|}

First leg

Second leg

HK Drott won 63–44 on aggregate.

Wildcard matches
The winners advanced to the group stage. The schedule and qualifying criteria were changed after Atlético Madrid withdrew.

|}

Match 1

First leg

Second leg

HC Metalurg won 45–39 on aggregate.

Match 2

First leg

Second leg

Wisła Płock won 55–52 on aggregate.

Match 3
A draw decided that Berlin played the first leg at home.

First leg

Second leg

HSV Hamburg won 57–56 on aggregate.

References

External links
 Official website

2013–14 EHF Champions League